Toronto Northeast was an Ontario provincial electoral district that existed from 1914 to 1926. It occupied an area north of College and Gerrard between University and Logan Ave. In 1926 there was a major redistribution of Ontario seats which resulted in Toronto Northeast being split between four new ridings called St. Patrick, St. George, St. David, and Eglinton.

The riding was a dual riding in that it elected two members to the Ontario provincial legislature. Elections were run as separate races for Seat A and Seat B rather than a combined race.

Boundaries
In 1914 the riding was created out of the old Toronto North riding. It bordered College Street, Carlton Street and Gerrard Street East on the south. The western boundary was Spadina Road from College Street north to the city limits. The eastern boundary was Logan Avenue from Gerrard Street East to the city limits. The northern boundary followed the city limits from Spadina to Logan.

In 1926 there was a major redistribution of Ontario seats which resulted in Toronto Northeast being split between the new ridings of St. Patrick, St. George, St. David, and Eglinton.

Members of Provincial Parliament

Election results
Elections were run as separate races for Seat A and Seat B rather than a combined race.

Seat A

Seat B

References

Notes

Citations

Former provincial electoral districts of Ontario
Provincial electoral districts of Toronto